Adonis Idaliou was a Cypriot football club based in Dali. Founded in 1956, was playing sometimes in Second, in Third and in Fourth Division.

Honours
 Cypriot Third Division:
 Champions (2): 1978, 1984
 Cypriot Fourth Division:
 Champions (1): 1996–97
Cypriot Cup for lower divisions:
 Winner (1): 2013–14

References

Association football clubs disestablished in 2015
Defunct football clubs in Cyprus
Association football clubs established in 1956
1956 establishments in Cyprus
2015 disestablishments in Cyprus